The 16th Filmfare Awards South Ceremony honoring the winners of the best of South Indian cinema in 1968 was an event held in 1969.

Awards

References

 Filmfare Magazine 1969.

General

External links
 
 

Filmfare Awards South